Cassady may refer to:

Cassady (grape)
Cassady (name), given name and surname
Cassady, Queensland, Australia, town now known as Taylor's Beach

See also
Cassidy (disambiguation)